The Geminids are a prolific meteor shower caused by the object 3200 Phaethon, which is thought to be a Palladian asteroid with a "rock comet" orbit. This would make the Geminids, together with the Quadrantids, the only major meteor showers not originating from a comet. The meteors from this shower are slow moving, can be seen in December and usually peak around December 4–16, with the date of highest intensity being the morning of December 14. The shower is thought to be intensifying every year, and recent showers have seen 120–160 meteors per hour under optimal conditions, generally around 02:00 to 03:00 local time. Geminids were first observed in 1862, much more recently than other showers such as the Perseids (36 AD) and Leonids (902 AD).

Radiant 

The meteors in this shower appear to come from the radiant in the constellation Gemini (hence the shower's name). However, they can appear almost anywhere in the night sky, and often appear yellowish in hue. Well north of the equator, the radiant rises about sunset, reaching a usable elevation from the local evening hours onwards. In the southern hemisphere, the radiant appears only around local midnight or so. Observers in the northern hemisphere will see higher Geminid rates as the radiant is higher in the sky. The Geminids are now considered by many to be the most consistent and active annual shower. Geminids disintegrate while at heights above .

See also 
 List of meteor showers

References

External links 

 Viewing details for the 2015 Geminids Meteor Shower
 Viewing information for the 2015 Geminids meteor shower
 NASA Meteor Watch 2012:
 Allsky cameras observed 328 bright Geminids - notice how similar they are to the orbit of the asteroid 3200 Phaethon (purple orbit)
 Composite view of meteors detected in the skies over Marshall Space Flight Center (MSFC)
 Spectacular Geminid, brighter than the Full Moon (video 2012-Dec-14 07:28 UT)
 Meteoroid Environment Office: 53 meteor orbits last night of which 18 were Geminids
 2004 Geminids
 2006 Geminids
 ShadowandSubstance.com: Geminids animated for 2010
 "Weird Geminids," NASA, 7 December 2001
 Google group search for Geminids, sorted by date
 Amateur observations of the Geminids
 Triangulation of a Geminid Meteor by Crayford Manor House AS
 ScienceCasts: Rock Comet Meteor Shower (Science@NASA YouTube channel : Nov 29, 2012)  
 Geminids at Constellation Guide

Meteor showers
December events